Fred Dickson  (July 4, 1937 – February 9, 2012) was a Canadian lawyer, politician, and a Conservative member of the Senate of Canada. Dickson was appointed on the advice of Stephen Harper to the Senate on January 2, 2009.

Career
He was counsel with the law firm of McInnes Cooper and has advised the federal and provincial governments on numerous resource and infrastructure projects, including serving as an advisor to the Government of Nova Scotia under Premier John Buchanan during the signing of the 1982 and 1985 Canada/Nova Scotia Offshore Oil and Gas Agreements. He was a director of the Offshore/Onshore Technologies Association of Nova Scotia and Canadian Council for Public-Private Partnerships.

He died on February 9, 2012, after a four-year battle with colon cancer.

References

External links
 

1937 births
2012 deaths
Deaths from cancer in Nova Scotia
Canadian senators from Nova Scotia
Canadian King's Counsel
Conservative Party of Canada senators
Deaths from colorectal cancer
Lawyers in Nova Scotia
People from Glace Bay
21st-century Canadian politicians